Ellery Calkins House is a historic home located at Cochecton in Sullivan County, New York.  It was built about 1890 and is a large, two story frame Queen Anne style dwelling.  It features a three-story corner tower with a steep pyramidal roof and stylish wraparound porch.

It was added to the National Register of Historic Places in 1992.

References

Houses on the National Register of Historic Places in New York (state)
Queen Anne architecture in New York (state)
Houses completed in 1890
Houses in Sullivan County, New York
National Register of Historic Places in Sullivan County, New York